Bathytoma ngatapa is an extinct species of sea snail, a marine gastropod mollusk in the family Borsoniidae.

Distribution
This extinct marine species is endemic to New Zealand .

Description

References

 Marwick, J. 1931: The Tertiary Mollusca of the Gisborne District. New Zealand; Geological Survey Palaeontological Bulletin 13: 177 p.
 Maxwell, P.A. (2009). Cenozoic Mollusca. pp 232–254 in Gordon, D.P. (ed.) New Zealand inventory of biodiversity. Volume one. Kingdom Animalia: Radiata, Lophotrochozoa, Deuterostomia. Canterbury University Press, Christchurch.

ngatapa
Gastropods of New Zealand